The Chavanon Viaduct is a suspension bridge located in the Chavanon Valley in France connecting the towns of Merlines and Messeix.  Opened for traffic in 2000, it has a main span of 300 metres.

See also
 List of bridges in France

External links
 
 A picture of the bridge

Suspension bridges in France
Bridges completed in 2000
21st-century architecture in France